Hugh Alfred Butler (February 28, 1878July 1, 1954) was an American Republican politician from Nebraska

Life and career
Hugh Butler was born on a farm near  Missouri Valley, Iowa on February 28, 1878. He graduated from Doane College at Crete, Nebraska in 1900, where, in 1897, he founded the Alpha Omega Fraternity. Butler toiled as a construction engineer with the Chicago, Burlington and Quincy Railroad  from 1900 to 1908. He entered politics as a member of the city board of Curtis, Nebraska from 1908 to 1913 and as a member of the board of education of Omaha, Nebraska. Meanwhile, from 1908 to 1940, Butler worked in flour-milling and in the grain business. 

Hugh Butler became a member of the Republican National Committee in 1936 and served until 1940 when he was elected to the United States Senate. He was reelected twice, in 1946 and 1952. Butler served as the chairman of the Committee on Public Lands in the Eightieth United States Congress (1947 to 1949) and as the chairman of the Committee on Interior and Insular Affairs in the Eighty-third United States Congress. A steadfast opponent of statehood for the Alaska Territory during most of his career in the Senate, he changed his mind during the last few months of his life. Butler died in office on the night of July 1, 1954, following a stroke that had occurred earlier in the day.

Butler and his Nebraska colleague, Senator Kenneth Wherry, are best known for an intense  opposition to international activities by the government, including entry into World War II, the Cold War, and the Korea War. He reflected the isolationism of the large German-American element in Nebraska. He vigorously opposed any loans or aid to Europe, including the Marshall Plan. He did not believe that the Soviet Union threatened Nebraska's interest, and he strongly opposed the Truman Doctrine, and NATO. Whatever the issue, he could be counted on as  a strong opponent of the Presidency of Harry Truman. 

Robert B. Crosby, governor of Nebraska at the time of Butler's death, appointed Samuel Williams Reynolds to fill his seat.

See also
 List of United States Congress members who died in office (1950–99)

References

Sources
  Bernard Lemelin, "Isolationist Voices in the Truman Era: Nebraska Senators Hugh Butler and Kenneth Wherry." Great Plains Quarterly 37.2 (2017): 83-109.

External links
  at Nebraska State Historical Society

1878 births
1954 deaths
People from Harrison County, Iowa
Politicians from Omaha, Nebraska
Republican Party United States senators from Nebraska
Nebraska city council members
School board members in Nebraska
Nebraska Republicans
American civil engineers
Doane University alumni
Old Right (United States)
20th-century American politicians
20th-century American engineers